The Scimitar class were a class of fast patrol boat formerly in service with the British Royal Navy.

The two vessels of this class were of a commercial design known as the Lifespan Patrol Vessel built by Halmatic (now BAE Systems Surface Ships), and formerly served in an inshore waterways anti-terrorist role in Northern Ireland. They were acquired for the Royal Navy in 2003 for service with the Gibraltar Squadron, releasing two  boats that had filled this role for service with the Cyprus Squadron.

With the decommissioning of the survey launch  in February 2018, the two Scimitar-class boats became the smallest commissioned vessels in the Royal Navy. The two vessels were returned to the U.K. from Gibraltar in 2020, having been replaced there by two Archer-class boats, but were reported as still operational in Portsmouth at the end of 2020. Both vessels were decommissioned in a joint ceremony at Portsmouth Naval Base on 30 March 2022.

Vessels in the class

See also

References

External links
 

 
Military boats
Patrol boat classes
Ship classes of the Royal Navy